Plasma renin activity (PRA), also known as the renin (active) assay or random plasma renin, is a measure of the activity of the plasma enzyme renin, which plays a major role in the body's regulation of blood pressure, thirst, and urine output. Measure of direct renin concentration (DRC) is technically more demanding, and hence PRA is used instead.
DRC assays are still in evolution, and generally a conversion factor of PRA (ng/mL/h) to DRC (mU/L) is 8.2. A recently developed and already commonly used automated DRC assay uses the conversion factor of 12. PRA is sometimes measured, specially in case of certain diseases which present with hypertension or hypotension. PRA is also raised in certain tumors. A PRA measurement may be compared to a plasma aldosterone concentration as an aldosterone-to-renin ratio (ARR).

Measurement and Values
Measurement is done from a sample of venous blood using immunological measuring mechanisms like ELISA, RIA, etc. Often these are done by automated machines to minimize human error.

Considerations for variation
Factors to take into account when interpreting results
 Age: in patients aged 65 years, renin can be lowered more than aldosterone by age alone, leading to raised ARR.
 Gender: premenstrual, ovulating females have higher ARR levels than age-matched men, especially during the luteal phase of the menstrual cycle, during which false positives can occur, but only if renin is measured as Direct renin concentration (DRC) and not as PRA (220).
 Time of day, recent diet, posture, and length of time in that posture
 State of water intake and hydration
 Salt intake
 Medications - Use of anti-hypertensive drugs, estrogen-containing forms of hormonal contraception, anti-anginals drugs, etc. (basically, most drugs that are active on the heart, blood vessels and/or the kidneys)
 Level of potassium
 Level of creatinine (kidney failure can lead to false-positive ARR)
 Certain diseases of the heart, kidneys, etc.
 Method of blood collection, including any difficulty doing so

Normal values
Reference ranges for blood tests of plasma renin activity can be given both in mass and in international units (μIU/mL or equivalently mIU/L, improperly shown as μU/mL or U/L, confusing mcU/mL used where Greek μ not available), with the former being roughly convertible to the latter by multiplying with 11.2. The following table gives the lower limit (2.5th percentile) and upper limit (97.5th percentile) for plasma renin activity by mass and MCU, with different values owing to various factors of variability of reference ranges:

Results and explanations

Please go through the physiology of renin and of the renin–angiotensin system to understand why the following occur.

Higher-than-normal levels may indicate:

Lower-than-normal levels may indicate:

References

Further reading
 MedlinePlus Medical Encyclopedia(Public Domain - copy left):.
 Brenner & Rector's The Kidney, 7th ed., Saunders, 2004. pp. 2118–2119. Full Text with MDConsult subscription.

Blood pressure
Renal physiology
Hormones of the kidneys
Peptide hormones
Nephrology